The 1925 Kansas Jayhawks football team was an American football team that represented the University of Kansas in the Missouri Valley Conference during the 1925 college football season. In its fifth and final season under head coach Potsy Clark, the team compiled a 2–5–1 record (2–5–1 against conference opponents), finished in eighth place in the conference, and was outscored by a total of 68 to 30. They played their home games at Memorial Stadium in Lawrence, Kansas. Reginald Smith was the team captain.

Schedule

References

Kansas
Kansas Jayhawks football seasons
Kansas Jayhawks football